Morven, or Mhoirbheinn, is a given name and may also refer to:

Places

Australia
 Morven, Queensland, a town and locality in the Shire of Murweh
 Morven, New South Wales
 Electoral district of Morven, Tasmania

Canada
 Morven, community in Loyalist, Ontario

New Zealand
 Morven, New Zealand, a settlement in Waimate District, Canterbury Region

Scotland
Morven, a historic spelling of Morvern, a traditional district and peninsula in the western Highlands
 Morven, Caithness, a mountain in northern Scotland
 Morven, Aberdeenshire, a mountain north of Ballater
 Morrone (sometimes known as Morven), a mountain near Braemar in Aberdeenshire

United States
 Morven, Georgia
 Morven, Indiana, an unincorporated community
 Morven (Princeton, New Jersey), historic home and state museum, listed on the NRHP in New Jersey
 Morven, North Carolina
 Morven, Ohio, a township in Marion County, 1824–1848, now part of Morrow County, Ohio
 Morven, Virginia, an unincorporated town in Amelia County, Virginia
 Morven, Arlington, Virginia, a former home on the site of present-day Fairlington, Virginia
 Morven (Cartersville, Virginia), listed on the NRHP in Virginia
 Morven Park, Leesburg, Virginia, listed on the NRHP in Virginia
 Morven (Markham, Virginia), listed on the NRHP in Virginia
 Morven (Simeon, Virginia), listed on the NRHP in Virginia

People
 Maclean baronets, of Morvaren (or Morvern) in the County of Argyll, Scotland
 Duchess of Morven or Annis Boudinot Stockton (1736–1801), an American poet
 Morven le Gaëlique, a pseudonym of Max Jacob (1876–1944), French poet, author, and painter
 Lady Morven Heller (born 1940), British philanthropist and wife of Sir Michael Heller
 Morven Christie (born 1981), Scottish actress